{{Infobox election
| election_name      = 2018 Penang state election
| country            = Penang
| type               = legislative
| ongoing            = no
| previous_election  = 2013 Penang state election
| previous_year      = 2013
| previous_mps       = List of Malaysian State Assembly Representatives (2013–2018)#Penang
| next_election      = 2023 Penang state election
| next_year          = 2023
| next_mps           = List of Malaysian State Assembly Representatives (2018–)#Penang
| seats_for_election = 40 seats to the Penang State Legislative Assembly
| elected_mps        = members elected
| majority_seats     = 21
| registered         = 945,627
| turnout            = 800,158
| election_date      = 9 May 2018
| image1             = Lim_Guan_Eng_2019.jpg
| image1_size        = 130px
| leader1            = Lim Guan Eng
| leader_since1      = 2008
| party1             = Pakatan Harapan (DAP) 
| color1             = E21118
| leaders_seat1      = Air Putih 
| last_election1     = 29 seats, 62.43%  (Pakatan Rakyat)
| seats_needed1      = | seats_before1      = 29
| seats1             = 37| seat_change1       = 8
| popular_vote1      =  530,008| percentage1        =  67.20%| swing1             = 4.77%
| image2             = Teng Chang Yeow.jpg
| image2_size        = 97px
| leader2            = Teng Chang Yeow
| leader_since2      = 2012
| party2             = Barisan Nasional (Gerakan) 
| colour2            = 000080 
| leaders_seat2      = Tanjong Bunga(lost seat)
| last_election2     = 10 seats, 32.09%    	
| seats_needed2      =  11
| seats_before2      = 10
| seats2             = 2
| seat_change2       = 8
| popular_vote2      = 176,723
| percentage2        = 22.41%
| swing2             = 9.68%

| image3             =  GS
| image3_size        = 150px
| leader3            = Muhammad Fauzi Yusoff 
| leader_since3      = Unknown
| party3             = Gagasan Sejahtera (PAS)
| colour3            = 009000
| leaders_seat3      = Permatang Pasir(lost seat)
| last_election3     = 1 seat, 5.10%   (Pakatan Rakyat)
| seats_needed3      =  20
| seats_before3      = 1
| seats3             = 1
| seat_change3       = 
| popular_vote3      = 77,171
| percentage3        = 9.78%
| swing3             = 4.68%

| title            = Chief Minister
| before_election  = Lim Guan Eng
| before_party     = Pakatan Harapan (DAP)
| after_election   = Chow Kon Yeow 
| after_party      = Pakatan Harapan (DAP)
| map_image        = Penang constituency map 2018.svg 
| map_size         = 
| map_caption      =Pakatan Harapan seats:Opposition seats:

}}
The 14th Penang election was held on 9 May 2018 to elect the State Assemblymen of the 14th Penang State Legislative Assembly, the legislature of the Malaysian state of Penang. The legislature had been dissolved on 9 April by the state's Governor, Abdul Rahman Abbas, on the advice of the then Chief Minister Lim Guan Eng, who also led the state's ruling Pakatan Harapan (PH) coalition.

The election was conducted by the Malaysian Election Commission and utilised the first-past-the-post system. Electoral candidates were nominated on 28 April. On 9 May, between 8.00 a.m. and 5.00 p.m. Malaysian time (UTC+8), polling was held in all 40 state constituencies throughout Penang; each constituency elects a single State Assemblyman to the state legislature.

The PH coalition retained power with a stronger mandate, as it swept eight additional constituencies to hold 37 seats (out of 40) in the Penang State Legislative Assembly; the PH thus commands a supermajority in the legislature. Following the simultaneous Malaysian general election, which saw the PH forming Malaysia's federal government for the first time in the country's history, Chow Kon Yeow was selected as Penang's fifth Chief Minister, succeeding Lim who was appointed as the federal Minister of Finance.

 Background 

The state election was the 14th state election in the State of Penang since the independence of Malaya (now Malaysia) in 1957. The governing Pakatan Harapan (PH) coalition sought to secure their third consecutive term in office since 2008.

According to the Constitution of the State of Penang, the maximum term of the Penang State Legislative Assembly, the legislature of Penang, is five years from the date of the first sitting of Assembly following a state election, after which it is dissolved by operation of law. The Assembly would have been automatically dissolved on 28 June 2018, the fifth anniversary of its first sitting on 28 June 2013.

However, the Chief Minister, as the head of government in Penang, may advise the Governor, the head of state, to dissolve the Assembly before the five-year period is up. Following the dissolution of the Malaysian Parliament by the then Malaysian Prime Minister, Najib Razak, on 7 April 2018, the Chief Minister of Penang at the time, Lim Guan Eng, was granted the consent of the governor of Penang, Abdul Rahman Abbas, on 9 April to dissolve the Assembly.

A state election must be held within sixty days after the dissolution. Accordingly, the Malaysian Election Commission set 28 April as the nomination day and 9 May as the polling day. The timing of the election, which was to be held on a weekday as opposed to the usual practice of holding elections on weekends, sparked outrage on social media.

 Political parties 
The Pakatan Harapan (PH), the ruling coalition in Penang, has been in power since 2008 and was led by the then Chief Minister Lim Guan Eng. In the aftermath of the 2013 state election, the PH controlled 29 out of the 40 seats in the Penang State Legislative Assembly.

The PH was challenged by two opposition coalitions, Barisan Nasional (BN) and Gagasan Sejahtera (GS), as well as a number of individual independent parties. The BN and GS coalitions were led by Teng Chang Yeow and Muhammad Fauzi Yusoff respectively.

 Electoral divisions 

All 40 state constituencies within Penang, which constitute the Penang State Legislative Assembly, were contested during the election. The Malaysian Election Commission utilised the updated electoral roll as of the fourth quarter of 2017; voters who had registered by the end of 2017 were therefore eligible for polling. Penang had a total of 945,627 voters .

 Electoral candidates 
By 27 April 2018, 471 nomination forms for Penang's state constituencies had been sold by the Malaysian Election Commission, making this election the most hotly contested election in Penang's history. A total of 155 candidates vied for the 40 state constituencies.

 Timeline 

 Pre-nomination events 

 Nomination centres 

 Campaign 

Analysts and news agencies, including Channel NewsAsia, The Straits Times and The Edge, predicted another victory for the Pakatan Harapan (PH) in Penang, due to the PH-led state government's achievements in social welfare and infrastructural developments, as well as Penang's economic growth under PH's tenure. Even so, the election was still hotly contested over several issues, including the vulnerability of the city-state to natural disasters such as floods and landslides, the proposed Penang Undersea Tunnel, transportation and public housing.
In particular, the PH administration placed considerable emphasis on Penang's achievements under its tenure, such as the state's solid economic performance, rapid development, overall cleanliness, public housing and the administration's social welfare policies. These were seen in contrast to the perceived discrimination of Penang by the Barisan Nasional-led federal government, especially in matters ranging from transportation to the lack of financial aid for Penang's flood victims.

 Manifestos 

 Barisan Nasional 
The Barisan Nasional (BN) coalition launched its Penang-specific manifesto on 15 April 2018 in Seberang Jaya. These were in addition to the previous promises made by various BN politicians, including the Malaysian Prime Minister and BN chairman, Najib Razak, to abolish toll charges for motorcycles on the Penang Bridge and to scrap the Penang Undersea Tunnel project, which had been proposed by Penang's Pakatan Harapan (PH) administration. BN politicians also claimed that the PH-led state government had failed to fulfil 51 promises and attempted to attract public attention on this issue by illegally pasting anti PH-posters throughout George Town on 20 March.

In response, the state government, led by the then Chief Minister Lim Guan Eng, slammed BN for deliberately copying the administration's policies into the BN manifesto, stating for the record that the government's policies, including social welfare programmes and reduced assessment rates for low-cost housing, have already been implemented. Notably, the BN manifesto failed to address the need for a rail-based public transportation system, such as LRT and monorail, within Penang; Lim maintained that the BN manifesto "offered no alternatives to building a public transport system to alleviate traffic congestion except to sabotage our proposed LRT and under-sea tunnel projects". Meanwhile, Jagdeep Singh Deo, the incumbent State Assemblyman for Datok Keramat, refuted BN's claims that Penang's PH-led state government had failed to provide affordable housing, reporting that more than 25,000 units of affordable housing have, in fact, been completed within the state. Critics also assert that the BN-led federal government has consistently discriminated the State of Penang by withholding major infrastructure projects and financial grants to the state.

 Pakatan Harapan 

The Pakatan Harapan (PH) coalition unveiled its Penang-specific manifesto on 25 April 2018 at the Penang Chinese Town Hall in George Town. The manifesto encompasses 68 pledges, including the implementation of the Penang Transport Master Plan which incorporates the proposed LRT and monorail services throughout the city-state, the construction of the Penang Undersea Tunnel, free-of-charge public bus services, a health-care programme which offers financial aid for lower-income households, a varsity township in Balik Pulau, the completion of more than 75,000 affordable housing units by 2025, a wider variety of public infrastructure, and a two-term limit for the position of the Chief Minister. In officiating the launch of the manifesto, PH leaders in Penang also promised financial funding for Islamic schools in the state and the promotion of interfaith harmony through the construction of a Harmony Centre' for non-Muslim affairs.

 Comparison of BN and PH manifestos 

 Social media 
The election was notable for the extensive use of social media, particularly by the opposing Pakatan Harapan (PH) and Barisan Nasional (BN) coalitions. Both sides created numerous videos to disseminate their policies, pledges and ideologies to the public in the run-up to the election.

Videos created by the PH typically depict the improvements experienced by Penangites since 2008, when the coalition's predecessor, the Pakatan Rakyat (PR), was voted into power. The PH-led state government's welfare policies, Penang's economic growth, the refurbishment of existing infrastructure, and efforts to improve cleanliness and reduce crime, as well as the preservation of forest reserves within the state, are often touted in these videos.

In contrast, BN's videos generated considerable controversy. On 22 February 2018, a video entitled "Penang, would you hear my story?" depicting a woman grousing about her disappointment with the general state of affairs in Penang under PH rule was uploaded online by a BN-linked Facebook page. It received widespread condemnation by netizens and PH politicians alike, and was generally seen as a BN propaganda effort designed to peddle half-truths and myths about Penang's PH-led government. An official of the state government, Zaidi Ahmad, rebutted all the allegations raised in the video, pointing out, among others, that Penangites' median income and average monthly income were greater than the national average, Penang's relatively low unemployment rate and water tariffs, and that the PH administration has indeed built more affordable housing units within the state. Meanwhile, on 23 April, Grace Teoh Koon Gee, a councillor of the Penang Island City Council, lodged a police report over a BN-made video which painted the PH as a racist party. RSN Rayer, a DAP politician, slammed the video as extremely dangerous and stated that the video was intended to "instigate voters to go against PH''".

During the campaigning period, a number of DAP candidates fell victim to slanderous social media content created by BN. For instance, Ramasamy Palanisamy, the Deputy Chief Minister II of Penang and the incumbent State Assemblyman for Perai, lodged a police report on 2 May over a manipulated video of his speech during a rally in Perai, which was reportedly circulated by BN. DAP's candidate in Seri Delima, Syerleena Abdul Rashid, also lodged a police report over BN's baseless allegations that she supported the Christian domination of Penang. BN cybertroopers targeted Satees Muniandy, the DAP candidate in Bagan Dalam, as well, claiming that he owns a luxurious house worth RM527,000.

Rallies 

Instead of holding large-scale rallies solely in Penang's capital city, George Town (on Penang Island), as was the practice in the 2008 and 2013 elections, the Pakatan Harapan (PH) organised simultaneous rallies in both George Town and mainland Seberang Perai. This change of tactic was intended to reach out to more voters, particularly in Seberang Perai, thus negating the need for supporters to travel across the Penang Strait to attend the rallies and reducing traffic congestion within George Town.

The first PH rallies were held concurrently on 28 April 2018 at George Town's Esplanade and Butterworth on the mainland; both rallies, which featured key speakers such as Lim Guan Eng, Nurul Izzah Anwar and Marina Mahathir, collectively attracted more than 120,000 people. Simultaneous PH rallies were also held on 2 May at George Town's Han Chiang College and Juru on the mainland, with the Han Chiang rally alone attended by a 120,000-strong crowd.

The last PH rallies were held at George Town's Esplanade on 7 and 8 May, the latter of which was held simultaneously with other PH rallies in Bayan Baru, Butterworth and Seberang Jaya. The PH rally at the Esplanade on 7 May collected RM84,335.70 worth of donations, with PH supporters staying on site despite the rain. Meanwhile, PH's last Esplanade rally on 8 May featured former United Malays National Organisation (UMNO) politician, Rafidah Aziz, as one of its key speakers, as well as the live telecast of a speech by Mahathir Mohamad, PH's candidate for the position of the Malaysian Prime Minister.

Controversies 
The decision by the Malaysian Election Commission to hold the election on a weekday (Wednesday, 9 May 2018), as opposed to the previous practice of holding elections on weekends, sparked considerable uproar on the Internet. Netizens voiced their displeasure and questioned the need to hold the polling day on a weekday, and alleged that this decision was intended to reduce voter turnout. In particular, voters residing outside Penang could be hampered from returning home for the polling day due to work commitments, thus carrying the potential of a lower voter turnout which would place the Pakatan Harapan (PH) at a disadvantage. In response to the nationwide criticism of the polling date, the then Malaysian Prime Minister, Najib Razak, subsequently declared 9 May as a national holiday.

During the polling day on 9 May, PH candidates, including Lim Guan Eng and Zairil Khir Johari, reported that their mobile phones and social media accounts were being subjected to cyber attacks. The candidates alleged that their mobile phones received a continuous stream of automatically generated spam calls from United States-based phone numbers by the minute, disrupting the coalition's communications and operations in the midst of polling.

Election pendulum
The 14th General Election witnessed 37 governmental seats and 3 non-governmental seats filled the Penang State Legislative Assembly. The government side has 25 safe seats and 2 fairly safe seats. However, none of the non-government side has safe and fairly safe seat.

Results 

The Pakatan Harapan (PH) coalition scored its best ever electoral results in Penang's history, seizing eight additional seats to increase its tally in the Penang State Legislative Assembly to 37, or 92.5% of the legislature. The election marked the debut of PH's newest component parties - the Malaysian United Indigenous Party (Bersatu) and the National Trust Party (Amanah) - into Penang's political arena, with each of the parties winning two constituencies. The People's Justice Party (PKR) also successfully increased its share in the legislature from 10 seats to 14 seats. Meanwhile, the Democratic Action Party (DAP) saw an increase in the majority in some of its 19 seats. The incumbent Chief Minister of Penang, Lim Guan Eng, defended the Air Putih constituency with over 80% of the popular vote, while Chow Kon Yeow won in Padang Kota with more than 70% of the popular vote. The largest margin of victory was recorded in Paya Terubong, where Yeoh Soon Hin of the DAP won by 31,189 votes.

The election also saw BN's worst performance in Penang's history, as the coalition lost eight constituencies to the PH and retained only two, both of which are won by the United Malays National Organisation (UMNO). Once again, BN's other component parties, namely Parti Gerakan Rakyat Malaysia (Gerakan), the Malaysian Chinese Association (MCA) and the Malaysian Indian Congress (MIC), did not win any seat. Although the Malaysian Islamic Party (PAS) lost the Permatang Pasir constituency, it managed to capture the Penaga constituency from the BN, thus giving the Islamist party a single seat in the Penang State Legislative Assembly.

Seats that changed allegiance

Aftermath 
The 14th Malaysian general election, which was held simultaneously with the Penang state election, resulted in the Pakatan Harapan (PH) coalition seizing power at the federal level from the incumbent Barisan Nasional (BN), making the election the first time since independence Malaysia experienced a regime change. On 12 May 2018, the incumbent Chief Minister of Penang, Lim Guan Eng, was appointed the Finance Minister by the new Malaysian Prime Minister, Mahathir Mohamad. Chow Kon Yeow, the chairperson of the Democratic Action Party in Penang, had been endorsed by Lim to succeed the latter as the Chief Minister; Chow was sworn in as Penang's fifth Chief Minister on 14 May.

Meanwhile, Barisan Nasional's Penang chief, Teng Chang Yeow, announced his retirement from politics in the aftermath of the coalition's rout in the hands of the PH. Aside from the PH administration's exemplary performance in Penang in the preceding 10 years, the trouncing of the BN was also attributed to the Malaysia-wide tsunami against the perceived corruption and maladministration by the previous BN-led federal government. Teng's counterpart in the United Malays National Organisation (UMNO), Zainal Abidin Osman, also tendered his resignation as the Penang chief of the BN component party.

See also
Constituencies of Penang
Elections in Penang

References

Penang state elections
Penang
Penang